Te Rarawa is a Māori iwi of Northland, New Zealand. The iwi is one of five  Muriwhenua iwi of the far north of the North Island.

Rūnanga and marae
Te Rarawa has 23 foundation marae:

Korou Kore Marae, Ahipara, represents the hapū of Ngāti Moroki.

Mātihetihe Marae, Mitimiti, represents the hapū of Te Tao Māui and Te Hokokeha.

Morehu Marae, Ōhaki Marae and Taiao Marae, Whāngāpe Harbour, represent the hapū of Te Uri o Tai.

Motutī Marae, Hokianga Harbour, represents the hapū of Ngāti Te Maara, Te Kaitutae, Ngāī Tamatea, Te Waiariki, and Ngāti Muri Kāhara.

Ngāti Manawa Marae, Panguru, represents the hapū of Ngāti Manawa, Waiāriki and Te Kaitutae.

Ōwhata Marae, Ōwhata Harbour, represents the hapū of Ngāti Torotoroa, Tahukai and Te Popoto.

Ngāi Tūpoto Marae, Motukaraka, represents the hapū of Ngāi Tūpoto and Ngāti Here.

Rangikohu Marae , Ōwhata Harbour, represents the hapū of Ngāti Kuri rāua ko Ngāti Wairupe and Te Aupōuri.

Roma Marae, Ahipara, represents the hapū of Ngāti Waiora, Ngāti Pākahi, Te Patukirikiri, and Parewhero.

Tauteihiihi Marae and Pikipāria Marae, Kohukohu, and Pāteoro Marae, Te Karae, represent the hapū of Ihutai.

Te Arohanui Marae, Mangataipa, represents Kohatutaka.

Te Kotahitanga Marae, Whāngāpe Harbour, represents the hapū of Ngāti Haua.

Te Uri o Hina Marae and Te Rarawa Marae, Pukepoto, represent the hapū of Ngāti Te Ao, Tahāwai, and Te Uri o Hina.

Waihou Marae, Hokianga Harbour, represents the hapū of Ngāti Te Reinga.

Wainui Marae, Ahipara, represents the hapū of Ngāti Moetonga and Te Rokekā.

Waiparera Marae, Rangi Point, represents the hapū of Patutoka.

Waipuna Marae, Panguru, represents the hapū of Te Kaitutae and Waiāriki.

Whakamaharatanga Marae, Manukau district, represents the hapū of Ngāti Hine and Patupīnaki.

Each marae elects a representative who acts on their behalf on the Rūnanga. The main role of the Rūnanga is to receive, hold, manage, and administer funds for the benefit of all iwi members, to ensure communication between all marae and the Rūnanga, and to hold the CEO accountable

Media
Te Reo Irirangi o Te Hiku o Te Ika, an iwi radio station, serves Te Rarawa and other Muriwhenua tribes of the Far North.

Notable people

 Hector Busby, navigator and waka (canoe or ship) builder
 Dame Whina Cooper, woman of mana, kuia, teacher, storekeeper and community leader
Dr Jenny Te Paa Daniel, public theologian and the first lay woman appointed to head an Anglican theological college in the Anglican Communion
 Makarena Dudley, psychologist, lecturer at the University of Auckland and dementia researcher
Ralph Hotere, artist from Mitimiti
Josh Ioane, rugby player for The All Blacks, and Highlanders
 Māmari Stephens, Senior Lecturer at the Victoria University of Wellington, compiled the first Māori legal dictionary
 Meri Te Tai Mangakāhia, Māori suffragist
 Anaru Iehu Ngawaka, leader and Anglican clergyman
 Ngahuia Piripi, television and film actress
 Nga-kahu-whero, Te Rarawa founding mother and a ruling chief
 Dr Papaarangi Mary-Jane Reid, Professor and Head of Department of Maori Health at the Faculty of Medical and Health Sciences at the University of Auckland
 Haimona "Simon" Snowden, respected kaumātua, orator and waiata composer
 Ngāwini Yates, a storekeeper, businesswoman and farmer in the later part of the 19th century

References

External links
Te Rarawa website

 
Iwi and hapū